State Route 129 (SR 129) is part of Maine's system of numbered state highways, located in southern Lincoln. It is one of several routes which "dead-end" on the Atlantic coast at their southern ends. The southern terminus of SR 129 is at Middle Road in South Bristol, a few miles north of Christmas Cove at the tip of South Bristol. The northern terminus is located at U.S. Route 1 Business (US 1 Bus.) in Damariscotta, an end it shares with SR 130.

Route description
SR 129 begins at Middle Road in South Bristol and heads north towards Bristol, where it connects with SR 130 another "dead-end" route which runs to Pemaquid Point at the southern tip of Bristol.  SR 129 and SR 130 are cosigned into Damariscotta where the highway intersects with US 1 Business.  Both routes terminate at this intersection.

History
As it was first designated in 1925, SR 129 extended south all the way to the tip of South Bristol at the intersection with Shipley Road.  In 2004, the route was truncated to the intersection with Middle Road, which remains its southern terminus.  No other major changes have been made to the route, except for the co-signing of SR 130 along its northern segment.

Major intersections

See also

References

129
Transportation in Lincoln County, Maine
Bristol, Maine
Damariscotta, Maine